Durrow is a civil parish in County Westmeath, Ireland.

Durrow is one of 8 civil parishes in the barony of Moycashel in the Province of Leinster. It is contiguous with the remainder of the Durrow civil parish, which is in County Offaly.

Durrow civil parish, County Westmeath comprises 8 townlands: Ballybroder, Ballycahan, Cappalahy, Derrygolan, Frevanagh, Keeloge, Pallas and Rostalla.

The neighbouring civil parishes are: Ardnurcher or Horseleap and Kilbeggan to the north, Rahugh to the east and County Offaly to the south and west.

References

External links
Durrow civil parish at the IreAtlas Townland Data Base
Durrow civil parish at townlands.ie
Durrow civil parish at The Placenames Database of Ireland

Civil parishes of County Westmeath